In Irish mythology, Finnguala (modern spellings: Fionnghuala,  Fionnuala , or  Finola; literally  meaning "white shoulder") was the daughter of Lir of the Tuatha Dé Danann. In the legend of the Children of Lir, she was changed into a swan and cursed by her stepmother, Aoife, to wander the lakes and rivers of Ireland, with her brothers Fiachra, Conn and Aodh, for 900 years until saved by the marriage of Lairgren, son of Colman, son of Cobthach, and Deoch, daughter of Finghin, whose union broke the curse. 'The Song of Fionnuala', with lyrics by Thomas Moore speaks of her wanderings.

The name is anglicized as Fenella. The shortened version Nuala is commonly used as a first name in contemporary Ireland.

People 

People named Fionnuala
 Fionnuala Boyd
 Fionnuala Carr
 Fionnuala Ellwood
 Fionnuala Kenny
 Fionnuala McCormack
 Fionnuala Ní Aoláin
 Fionnuala Ní Fhlatharta
 Fionnuala Ní Flaithbheartaigh
 Fionnuala Sherry
 Fionnuala Sweeney

People named Fionnula
 Fionnula Flanagan

People named Finola
Finola Dwyer
Finola Hughes
Finola Moorhead
Finola O'Donnell
Finola O'Farrell

References

Mythological cycle
Shapeshifting
Legendary birds
Female legendary creatures